Pharnabazus (Old Iranian: Farnabāzu, Ancient Greek: Φαρνάβαζος; died before 430 BCE), was a member of the Pharnacid dynasty that governed the province of Hellespontine Phrygia as satraps for the Achaemenid Empire.

He is a very obscure figure, almost always mentioned alongside his father Artabazus. He may have succeeded his father as satrap between 455 and 430 BCE, but it is also possible that Artabazus was directly succeeded by his grandson (Pharnabazus' son), Pharnaces II.

References

Year of birth unknown
430s BC deaths
Achaemenid satraps of Hellespontine Phrygia
5th-century BC Iranian people
Pharnacid dynasty